Sidi Ali Benyoub is a town and commune in Sidi Bel Abbès Province in north-western Algeria. It is located at 34°56'44"N, 0°43'10"W. between Tabia and Mezaourou.

It is also known as Chanzy, with reference to Alfred Chanzy, French settler who was the first to settle there.

References

Communes of Sidi Bel Abbès Province
Cities in Algeria
Algeria